Warrenheip  is a suburb of Ballarat, Victoria, Australia on the eastern rural-urban fringe named after nearby Mount Warrenheip.

Precolonial history and name origins
Mount Warrenheip is situated on the traditional country of the Wathaurong people to whom it holds significant cultural, social and spiritual significance. The name Warrenheip is taken from the Wathaurong word Warrengeep, meaning “emu feathers”, believed to relate to the appearance of  ferns on the side of the mountain which look like emu feathers.

Colonial era and the Victorian Gold Rush
Gold prospectors from nearby goldfields in Ballarat were present around Warrenheip by the 1860s there was a predominantly Irish farming community by the early 1870,s and a primary school was opened in 1876.  Warrenheip was established as a electoral division, the Electoral district of Warrenheip in 1889, the electorate was abolished in 1927 when it became the electoral district of Warrenheip and Grenville. A train line from Geelong to Ballarat was built nearby and Warrenheip railway station opened in 1873.

Modern history
As Ballarat expanded eastward during the 1980s, the junction of the Western Highway became a location for light industry.  Today the industry dominates Warrenheip and continues to expand with the development of business parks.  Residential Warrenheip consists mainly of large semi-rural blocks.

References

Suburbs of Ballarat